The Taiwan Communist Party was a social democratic political party in Taiwan. It was established in 1994 but was unable to register with the Ministry of the Interior until 2008, when anti-communist provisions in Taiwan's constitution were struck down by the Constitutional Court.

History 
The Taiwan Communist Party was founded by Wang Lao-yang on 16 October 1994 in Sinhua, Tainan. Before founding the party, Wang was an active member of the Democratic Progressive Party (DPP). Wang left the DPP after an internal party struggle, in which the faction he favoured lost.

A wealthy landowning farmer, Wang spent the next thirteen years and NT$60 million (US$1.85 million in 2008) trying to register the Taiwan Communist Party with the Ministry of the Interior, but his annual applications were repeatedly rejected. It was not until 20 June 2008 that Wang's goal was finally realised; on that day, the justices of the Constitutional Court ruled the prohibition of communism in Taiwan unconstitutional, thus allowing the registration of communist parties. Wang subsequently registered the Taiwan Communist Party on the same day, making it the first party to legally include "communist" in its name after the ruling.

Wang claimed that the party had grown to 2,000 members by the end of 2008.

The Taiwan Communist Party was dissolved by the Ministry of Interior on 29 April 2020.

Ideology 
Although the party had "communist" in its name, Wang stated in an interview that he had never read the works of Karl Marx or Vladimir Lenin, and he only chose the name because he thought it would attract more interest. Wang described the party as social democratic, and advocated the establishment of a welfare state and mutual aid in Taiwan. Wang also stated that the party's purpose was to "create a socialist paradise in Taiwan" by "upholding the socialist line and the legacy of Sun Yat-sen and his Three Principles of the People".

However, one of the party's vice chairmen, Chien Ping-hung, stated in an interview that the party had an ideologically diverse membership, from moderate progressives disillusioned with the DPP to devout Marxists. For example, another vice chairman of the party, Wu Miao-huo, claimed to have spent two decades studying Marxism in mainland China. Nonetheless, the party was officially not communist, and as such it did not attempt to establish relations with the Chinese Communist Party.

Notes

References 

2008 establishments in Taiwan
Political parties established in 2008
Social democratic parties in Taiwan